The Glasflügel H-301 Libelle is an early composite single-seat sailplane produced by Glasflügel from 1964 to 1969. The H-301 had camber-changing wing flaps so was required to compete in the Open Class because the Standard Class excluded wing flaps. It was often known as the Open Class Libelle.

Development
In 1964 the H-301 Libelle ("Dragonfly") received the first German and first U.S. Type Certificate issued to an all-fiberglass aircraft. It had flaps, water ballast and retractable landing gear.

There are two canopy variants: the normal canopy and a sleeker, lower-profiled 'racing' canopy with no side vent. The canopy is unique in that it has a catch that enables the front to be raised by 25 mm (1 in) in flight to provide a flow of ventilating air instead of the more conventional small sliding panel used for this purpose.

The American Wil Schuemann pioneered several performance-enhancing modifications to the type, including a re-profiled wing, converting the airfoil to a Wortmann section, various fairings, a new canopy and a reshaped fuselage nose. Aircraft incorporating these changes are informally known as 'Schümanised' Libelles.

Design
Wings: spar and shell of balsa or foam / reinforced plastic sandwich
Ailerons: balsa or synthetic foam / reinforced plastic sandwich.
Horizontal stabilizer: reinforced plastic
Elevator: reinforced plastic
Automatic connections for airbrakes, flaps and elevator. Ailerons are connected by a "pip" pin

The H-201 Standard Libelle was developed in 1967 as a Standard Class variant.

The Libelle was a popular and influential design. Its light wings and easy rigging set a new benchmark.

Handling is generally easy except that it is sensitive to sideslipping and has relatively ineffective airbrakes that make short landings tricky for inexperienced pilots.

The H-201 Libelle (standard class) was superseded by the Hornet.

The H-301 Libelle (open class) was superseded by the Mosquito.

Specifications

See also

References

Thomas F, Fundamentals of Sailplane Design, College Park Press, 1999
Simons M, Segelflugzeuge 1965–2000, Eqip, 2004
Sailplane Directory

Glasflügel aircraft
1960s German sailplanes
Aircraft first flown in 1964
Mid-wing aircraft